The Journal of Political Philosophy is a quarterly peer-reviewed academic journal covering all aspects of political philosophy.

Controversy
The journal became engaged in a controversy when it published three articles on Black Lives Matter, each written by white academics and previously presented at a conference on that subject. The controversy began when Yale professor Christopher Lebron published an "open letter" criticising the journal for not having included "philosophers of color" in the symposium. Lebron further claimed that the journal had not, up to that point, published on race since the beginning of the Black Lives Matter movement began, and that it had not published a philosopher of color since the journal's inception. The conference organizers pointed out that they had invited philosophers of color to contribute to the symposium but that none had chosen to. Others noted that the Journal of Political Philosophy had published on race since the beginning of Black Lives Matter movement, and that they had published philosophers of color - indeed, the journal was co-founded by Chandran Kukathas, a philosopher of color. The editors issued a formal apology, promised to add at least two African American academics to the editorial board, and committed to seeking more works written by non-white academics.

Abstracting and indexing 
The journal is abstracted and indexed in:

According to the Journal Citation Reports, the journal has a 2015 impact factor of 1.044, ranking it 63rd out of 163 journals in the category "Political Science" and 24th out of 51 journals in the category "Ethics".

See also

 List of ethics journals
 List of political science journals

References

External links 
 

English-language journals
Political philosophy journals
Quarterly journals
Publications established in 1993
Wiley-Blackwell academic journals